Where the Boys Are '84 (onscreen title: Where the Boys Are) is a 1984 American sex comedy film that was directed by Hyman Jack "Hy" Averback (the last film he ever directed) and starred Lisa Hartman, Lorna Luft, Wendy Schaal, and Lynn-Holly Johnson. A remake of the 1960 film Where the Boys Are, it was produced by Allan Carr. It was the first film released by Tri-Star Pictures.

Plot 
Four co-eds from snowbound Penmore College in the Northeast head to Fort Lauderdale, Florida for spring break: Carole (Lorna Luft) is taking a separate vacation from her steady boyfriend Chip (Howard McGillin), but she winds up as a hot contender in a "Hot Bod Contest;" Jennie (Lisa Hartman) is doubly lucky, courted by both a rich classical pianist (Daniel McDonald) and a devil-may-care rocker (Russell Todd); Sandra (Wendy Schaal) is looking for the Mr. Right who will finally satisfy her; and Laurie (Lynn-Holly Johnson) is a sex crazed nymphomaniac who dreams of a night of unbridled passion with a real he-man. Laurie ends up getting her wish, albeit through a rather unexpected source.

During the week-long festivities, the girls meet Sandra's snobbish aunt Barbara Roxbury (Louise Sorel) and her friend Maggie (Alana Stewart) and get to sample much of Fort Lauderdale's nightlife. They are also invited to a formal party at Barbara's house, which ends up being crashed by hundreds of spring breakers.

Cast 
 Lisa Hartman as Jennie Cooper
 Russell Todd as Scott Nash
 Lorna Luft as Carole Singer
 Wendy Schaal as Sandra Roxbury
 Lynn-Holly Johnson as Laurie Jameson
 Howard McGillin as Chip
 Louise Sorel as Barbara Roxbury
 Alana Stewart as Maggie
 Christopher McDonald as Tony
 Daniel McDonald as Camden Roxbury III
 Jude Cole as Jude
 George Coutoupis as Ray
 Asher Brauner as Officer Ernie Grasso
 Frank Zagarino as Conan
 Dara Sedaka as Christine
 Barry Marder as Rappaport

Production 
Posters and advertising material presented the film's title as Where the Boys Are '84, the onscreen title is simply Where the Boys Are.

In an interview on the DVD Wendy Schaal remembered it as a fun production with a party atmosphere, thanks to producer Allan Carr who was known for his parties. Schaal admitted they were smoking real marijuana in the beach funeral scene. Russell Todd's singing was dubbed by Peter Beckett, vocalist with Player and Little River Band.

Touted as a more "realistic" version of the popular 1960 film, with nudity and drug references, the date rape storyline of the original does not appear in this version.

Where the Boys Are '84 was filmed from May 16 to June 26, 1983 at the following Florida locations: Royal Palm Yacht and Country Club in Boca Raton; Lauderdale Beach Hotel, Bootleggers and City Limits Nightclub in Fort Lauderdale; Young Circle Bandshell in Hollywood.

Release 
Where the Boys Are '84 was produced independently by ITC Productions and was distributed by Tri-Star Pictures after Universal Pictures rejected it. On April 3, 1984, it was screened at the National Theater in New York City with Allan Carr and the principal cast attending the premiere, as well as the post-premiere party at Studio 54.

The film was released nationwide on April 6, 1984 and was both a box office and critical flop. It ranked #5 at the US box office grossing $3.6 million on its opening weekend. Its total domestic gross was $10.5 million.

Reception 
Janet Maslin, writing for The New York Times, called the film "dumb, vulgar and mostly humorless." Roger Ebert, writing for The Chicago Sun-Times, reported, "It isn't a sequel and isn't a remake and isn't, in fact, much of anything."
Reel Film Reviews' David Nusair wrote: "There's ultimately not a whole lot within Where the Boys Are worth embracing or getting excited about..."

Accolades

Soundtrack 

Where the Boys Are '84: Music from the Motion Picture Soundtrack was released in April 1984 on vinyl and cassette tape by RCA Records. The soundtrack features ten songs, all of which appear in various scenes throughout the film. The title track cover version by Lisa Hartman was released as a single with the B-side "Hot Nights" by Jude Cole, however, it failed to chart. Lorna Luft recorded a disco version of "Where the Boys Are" released concurrently with the film although it was not a soundtrack item: produced by Joel Diamond, this version - credited mononymously to Lorna - featured background vocals by members of Village People.

 Side A
 "Hot Nights" – performed by Jude Cole
 "Seven Day Heaven" – performed by Shandi
 "Mini-Skirted" – performed by Sparks
 "Be-Bop-a-Lula" – performed by The Rockats
 "Jenny" – performed by Peter Beckett

 Side B
 "Where the Boys Are" – performed by Lisa Hartman
 "Woman's Wise" – performed by The Rockats
 "Girls Night Out" – performed by Toronto
 "Slippin' & Slidin'" – performed by Phil Seymour
 "All Fired Up" – performed by Rick Derringer

Home media 
The film was released on VHS as 20th Century Fox offshoot Key Video. The DVD release was marred by copyright disagreement between Tri-Star and ITC Productions. On February 6, 2018 Scorpion Releasing issued a remastered version of the film on Blu-ray, with DTS-HD Master Audio 2.0.

See also 
Spring Break, a 1983 film with a similar setting and tone

References

External links 
 
 
 
 

1984 films
1980s teen comedy films
1980s sex comedy films
American coming-of-age films
American sex comedy films
American teen comedy films
Remakes of American films
Films about spring break
Films set in Fort Lauderdale, Florida
Films shot in Florida
Teen sex comedy films
ITC Entertainment films
TriStar Pictures films
Films directed by Hy Averback
Films produced by Allan Carr
Films scored by Sylvester Levay
Golden Raspberry Award winning films
Comedy film soundtracks
1984 soundtrack albums
1984 comedy films
1980s English-language films
1980s American films